Graham Andrew Colditz  MD, DrPH (born 1 November 1954) is an Australian chronic disease epidemiologist. He is the inaugural Niess-Gain Professor at Washington University School of Medicine, where he is associate director for Prevention and Control at the Alvin J. Siteman Cancer Center. He directs the Master of Population Health Science at Washington University School of Medicine. During medical training he was excited by the potential for prevention of chronic diseases. With encouragement from mentors he pursued training in the US as it was routine for academics in Australia to obtain overseas training at that time. He is internationally recognized for leadership in cancer prevention, and is often interviewed by media for input on this topic. With members of Cancer Prevention and Control at Siteman, he blogs on issues relating to cancer prevention and screening. According to Google Scholar statistics, Colditz has the highest h-index of any living author, second only to Michel Foucault.

Birth and education
Colditz was born in Australia and educated at Newington College (1967–72). He was active in cricket and rugby at Newington. He received his B.Sc. and medical degree from the University of Queensland, Australia, where he served as President of the Australian Medical Students Association in 1977. He obtained his M.P.H. and Doctorate in Public Health from Harvard University School of Public Health. Placing great importance on applying the scientific evidence amassed through research, Dr. Colditz has taken the lead on a number of large health communication projects, including the development of the long-running, popular health risk assessment, Your Disease Risk. At Siteman he leads efforts to promote cancer prevention in the community

Dr.P.H, 1986, Harvard School of Public Health
M.P.H, 1982, Harvard School of Public Health
M.D, 1998, University of Queensland School of Medicine
M.B., B.S., 1979, University of Queensland School of Medicine

Awards and honors
 1975 National Heart Foundation of Australia Scholarship
 1976 National Heart Foundation of Australia Scholarship
 1977 Asthma Foundation of Queensland Medical Scholarship
 1977 Australian Medical Students' Association—Eli Lilly Research Fellowship
 1981-82 Fulbright Postgraduate Student Award
 1981-83 Frank Knox Memorial Fellowship, Harvard University
 1991-96 American Cancer Society, Faculty Research Award
 1997 Raine Visiting professor, Department of Public Health, University of Western Australia
 1998 Visiting Scientist, Cancer Foundation of Western Australia
 1999 Leonard S. Schuman Lecture, University of Michigan
 2002 Rotan Lecture, MD Anderson Cancer Center
 2003 AACR-DeWitt S. Goodman Memorial Lectureship
 2004 American Society for Preventive Oncology, Distinguished Achievement Award
 2005 Cassel Distinguished Lecturer, University of North Carolina, Chapel Hill, Lineberger Comprehensive Cancer Center
 2006 Institute of Medicine, Member
 2007 Academy of Science, St. Louis, Fellow
 2008 Kaner Memorial Lecture, Norris Cotton Cancer Center, Dartmouth College
 2009 Harvard School of Public Health, Alumni Award of Merit
 2011 American Cancer Society Medal of Honor
 2012 AACR- ACS award for excellence in cancer epidemiology and prevention
 2014 American Society of Clinical Oncology-American Cancer Society Award
 2014 Newington Medalist – International
 2014 LessCancer.org National Cancer Prevention Day Ronald B. Herberman Speaker
 2016 Highly Cited Researchers (h>100) according to their Google Scholar Citations public profiles. Rank 1. Graham Colditz. January 2016 edition 2016.1.1
 2018 Daniel P. Schuster Award for Distinguished Work in Clinical and Translational Science, Washington University School of Medicine
 2018 Fellow, American Association for the Advancement of Science
 2020 Washington University School of Medicine Academy of Educators
 2020 American College of Epidemiology's Lilienfeld Award
 2021 AACR Distinguished Lectureship on the Science of Cancer Health Disparities
 2021 Lifetime Membership of the Australasian Epidemiological Association
 2022 The University of Queensland Alumnus of the Year

References

External links
Graham Colditz, MD, DrPH, FAFPHM
Your Disease Risk
Master of Population Health Science, WUSM
8 Ways to Prevent Cancer series

1954 births
Living people
People educated at Newington College
Harvard School of Public Health alumni
Australian epidemiologists
University of Queensland Mayne Medical School alumni
Members of the National Academy of Medicine
Washington University School of Medicine faculty